Resurrection is an EP by the American heavy metal band Fear Factory. It was released on September 14, 1998.

Song information
"Resurrection" is one of singer Burton C. Bell's favorite Fear Factory songs. It is the ninth and longest track on the 1998 concept album Obsolete. The album version runs 6:35. The song highlights the thoughts of the album's protagonist, the dissident Edgecrusher, as he flees the oppressing forces of Securitron. Having witnessed an act of self-immolation during a protest and the subsequent dispersal of the crowd by armed forces, Edgecrusher flees to a church where he discovers a statue of Jesus, which he touches, giving him the courage to continue his personal mission against the government.

The Allmusic review of Obsolete said, "The album's biggest surprise however is 'Resurrection,' which is perhaps the most tuneful song Fear Factory have ever done, without compromising their heavy sound."

US track listing

Japanese track listing

Credits

Fear Factory
 Burton C. Bell − vocals
 Dino Cazares − guitar
 Christian Olde Wolbers − bass guitar
 Raymond Herrera − drums

Charts

References

1998 singles
Albums with cover art by Dave McKean